The Movement of Popular Participation is a Uruguayan political party. It is a member organisation of the left-wing Broad Front coalition.

Background
From 1985 onwards, after the end of the military dictatorship and the amnesty that freed those Tupamaros imprisoned during the regime, there was debate among different factions within the Tupamaros about whether or not to participate in the legal political system. In the end, those who favored the democratic ways prevailed.

Foundation
In 1989, the Tupamaros were admitted within the ranks of the Broad Front and, together with other groups of the radical left such as the People's Victory Party (PVP), the Oriental Revolutionary Movement (MRO) and the Socialist Workers' Party, they created the Movement of Popular Participation (MPP). However, the Tupamaros within the MPP declined to participate in the elections. As a result of the legislative elections of 1989, the MPP won two seats in the Chamber of Deputies: Helios Sarthou (a Union lawyer) and Hugo Cores (PVP).

It has since become the largest faction within the Broad Front, the leftist coalition which won the elections in 2004 and took power in March 2005. Its main leader is José Mujica.

In 1992, the MRO decided to leave the MPP (and soon afterwards, the Broad Front) due to political differences with the direction the MPP was taking, stating that "it was growing apart from the ideas of Raúl Sendic regarding the foreign debt, the nationalization of banks and external trade".

In the elections of 1994 former guerrilla members participated in Uruguayan elections for the first time as candidates for Parliament. The MPP gained in votes, thus obtaining two seats in the Chamber of Deputies (José Mujica and Eleuterio Fernández Huidobro) and one in the Senate (Sarthou).

Towards 1999, Mujica had become a major political phenomenon, due in part to his blunt style and his clarity. In the elections of that year, Mujica ran for the Senate and the turnout for the MPP was increased, giving the party two seats in the upper chamber. The growth in popularity continued so that in 2004 the MPP got six seats in the Senate, and contributed to the victory of presidential candidate Tabaré Vázquez who then became the first left-wing president of the country. During the Vázquez administration, several members of the MPP held key positions. Mujica was Minister of Livestock, Agriculture and Fisheries, and Eduardo Bonomi was Minister of Labor.

Since 2007 new trends within the MPP have led to the creation of the CAP-L, led by Huidobro. In the primary elections of 2009, the MPP reasserted its supremacy as the most important faction in the Broad Front. Mujica quit the MPP after the primary elections so that he would not be tied to any particular group within the Broad Front. He subsequently won the elections in the same year in November.

Electoral history

Presidential elections

See also
 Politics of Uruguay

References

External links
Official web site

1989 establishments in Uruguay
Anti-capitalist political parties
Broad Front (Uruguay)
Marxist parties in Uruguay
Political parties established in 1989
Political parties in Uruguay
Political party factions in Uruguay
Progressive parties
Socialist parties in Uruguay